Mark R. Honadel (born March 29, 1956) is a Wisconsin welder and independent businessman, a former professional metal fabricator, welding instructor, industrial manager, and was a Republican politician and legislator.

Born in Milwaukee, Wisconsin, Honadel was raised in Oak Creek, Wisconsin, and graduated from Oak Creek High School in 1974. He attended Milwaukee Area Technical College and Marquette University.

Honadel was elected to the Wisconsin State Assembly in July 2003 in a special election, and was re-elected in 2004, 2006, 2008, 2010 and 2012. He represented South Milwaukee and surrounding areas. Honadel served as Majority Caucus Chairperson in 2007. In 2013 Honadel resigned from the Assembly 
for an undisclosed job in the private sector. His position was filled by a special election, won by Republican Jessie Rodriguez, on November 19, 2013.

Notes

1956 births
Businesspeople from Milwaukee
Living people
Marquette University alumni
Milwaukee Area Technical College alumni
Politicians from Milwaukee
21st-century American politicians
People from Oak Creek, Wisconsin
People from South Milwaukee, Wisconsin
Republican Party members of the Wisconsin State Assembly